Doxbin is a type of pastebin and is primarily used and designed for the purpose of doxing. It gained some media attention partially because it was/is used for the purpose of swatting.

Legality 
Doxbin has seemed to avoid any heavy attention from law enforcement due to their rules and regulations users have to abide by when using the service.
 
Doxbin does not allow any minor, illegally obtained or harassing/threatening info. Using Section 230 of the Communications Decency Act to be immune to liability of cyberstalking laws globally.
 
The privacy policy mentions that they do not allow illegally obtained material and instigates by saying "Can anybody prove it? Not unless you brag about it". It also states that "Doxbin was not made for harassment, intimidation or to cause nuisance", but also states that "it is impossible for some PHP code to harass somebody".

Doxbin and Lapsus$ 
"White" was a founding leader of a ransomware group named Lapsus$ which had a list of notable data leaks, such as ones from Nvidia, T-Mobile, and Rockstar Games.
 
The feud between the Doxbin owner kt and between White had been ongoing since he leaked the Doxbin database.
 
kt had eventually doxed White on January 8, 2022, and published his personal details onto Doxbin.
 
White's house was raided on the morning of April 1st 2022 and earlier in December 2021, both in relation to Lapsus$.
 
He was charged with:
 
 Three counts of unauthorized access to a computer with intent to impair the reliability of data.
 One count of fraud by false representation.
 One count of unauthorized access to a computer with intent to hinder access to data.
 One count of causing a computer to perform a function to secure unauthorized access to a program.

"Swatting" incident 
In July 2020, John William Kirby Kelley, who was involved in a neo-Nazi swatting conspiracy and a group linked to a neo-Nazi terrorist network known as Atomwaffen Division, admitted helping maintain Doxbin. According to federal prosecutors, the group maintains Doxbin to list past and potential swatting targets.

References 

Internet privacy